Ravenna Airport  is an airport serving the locality of Ravenna, in the Emilia-Romagna province of Italy.

See also

List of airports in Italy

References

Airports in Italy
Ravenna
Province of Ravenna
Emilia-Romagna